Jan Van Den Herrewegen (born 9 September 1993 in Oudenaarde) is a professional squash player who represented Belgium. He has won the 2016 Squash Belgium Championship, Sutton Coldfield Open 2015, 2016 and reached a career-high world ranking of World No. 89 in February 2017.

References

External links 

Belgian male squash players
Living people
1993 births
People from Oudenaarde
Sportspeople from East Flanders